Gwyndaf Evans (born 4 June 1959) is a Welsh former rally driver. He won the British Rally Championship in 1996, and was also the runner-up in 1995, 1998, 1999 and 2010. On the international stage his participation was limited, but he used his local knowledge to great success in the RAC Rally, where he won the Group N production car class twice driving a Ford Sierra RS Cosworth 4x4, in 1990 and Ford Escort RS Cosworth in 1993. In 1994, driving a Group A Ford Escort RS2000, he scored a then career high seventh place overall, winning his class once more, before going one better with a sixth place finish the following year, and his fourth class victory in six years.

In 1997 he switched to SEAT, who were competing with their Ibiza GTI 16v, and later the Córdoba WRC from 1999 to 2001. In 2002 he moved to MG and an MG ZR S1600, spending two years on the international circuit with Chris Patterson, and the British Championship with Claire Mole, after splitting with long-time co-driver Howard Davies.

He drove a Mitsubishi Lancer Evolution in the now renamed Wales Rally GB in 2004 and 2006, with the latter being where he won the 2006 Mitsubishi Evo Challenge Trophy. His prize was a works-prepared Lancer Evolution for the 2007 British Rally Championship.

He now runs the family Ford and Suzuki dealership in Dolgellau, first established by his grandfather in Dinas Mawddwy in 1930, and renamed to Gwyndaf Evans Motors in 1983. The company now supports Gwyndaf's son Elfyn, who competes at an international level as a rally driver in the WRC.

World Rally Championship results

References

External links
 

1959 births
Living people
People from Dolgellau
Sportspeople from Gwynedd
World Rally Championship drivers
Welsh rally drivers
20th-century Welsh businesspeople
21st-century Welsh businesspeople
Cupra Racing drivers